John Albeni de Alben et Medve (died after 15 August 1420) was a Hungarian noble of German descent, who served as Ban of Croatia and Dalmatia between May 1414 and April 1419.

The family came into Hungary with Sigismund of Luxembourg. He was a son of Rudolf Albeni. He had five brothers, including John, Sr., Peter and Henry, and three sisters. He had no children. His appointment to the position of ban (viceroy) was due to his influential uncle, bishop of Zagreb Eberhard Albeni. John took part in the Council of Constance (1414–1415).

After his uncle's death he lost his office and was replaced by Ivan Nelipčić.

References

  Markó, László: A magyar állam főméltóságai Szent Istvántól napjainkig – Életrajzi Lexikon p. 436. (The High Officers of the Hungarian State from Saint Stephen to the Present Days – A Biographical Encyclopedia) (2nd edition); Helikon Kiadó Kft., 2006, Budapest; .

14th-century births
1420 deaths
Bans of Croatia
John
Hungarian people of German descent